Jabot may refer to:
 Jabot (horse), a racehorse
 Jabot (neckwear)
 Jabot (window)
 Jabat Island, in the Marshall Islands
 Jabot Airport
 Jabot Cosmetics, a fictional company depicted in the soap Young and the Restless
 Jabot, a knot in an Ascot tie